Henri Villecourt (born 19 March 1938) is a French basketball player. He competed in the men's tournament at the 1960 Summer Olympics.

References

1938 births
Living people
French men's basketball players
Olympic basketball players of France
Basketball players at the 1960 Summer Olympics
Sportspeople from Loire (department)